Bloomfield railway station was part of the Belfast and County Down Railway's main line from Belfast to Comber. The station opened 12 May 1879 and closed on 24 April 1950.

References

Disused railway stations in County Down
Disused railway stations in Belfast
Railway stations opened in 1879
Railway stations closed in 1950
Railway stations in Northern Ireland opened in the 19th century